Tingstadstunneln (Tingstad Tunnel) is a motorway tunnel under the Göta älv, connecting Hisingen with mainland Gothenburg. The tunnel was constructed with two parallel immersed tubes with three lanes of traffic in each tube. It is part of the E6 route linking Norway with south-west Sweden.

Construction started on 17January 1961, and the tunnel was inaugurated at 11:30 am on 29March 1968.

The tunnel has severe traffic congestion problems since several years, so therefore a new tunnel is built a little farther north, Marieholmstunneln, to be opened in 2020.

References 

Buildings and structures in Gothenburg
Undersea tunnels in Europe
Road tunnels in Sweden
Tunnels completed in 1968
Hisingen
Immersed tube tunnels in Sweden
1968 establishments in Sweden